Eldaniz Azizli (born 20 April 1992) is a world-champion Azerbaijanis wrestler competing in the 55 kg division of Greco-Roman wrestling.

He won a gold medal at the 2018 World Wrestling Championships.

In 2020, he won one of the bronze medals in the men's 55 kg event at the 2020 Individual Wrestling World Cup held in Belgrade, Serbia.

In 2022, Eldaniz Azizli won the decisive fight over Nugzari Tsurtsumia (Georgia) - 8:2 and having won a gold medal, became a two-time European champion. A few months later, he won the silver medal in his event at the Matteo Pellicone Ranking Series 2022 held in Rome, Italy. He won the gold medal in his event at the 2021 Islamic Solidarity Games held in Konya, Turkey.

References

External links 
 

Living people
1992 births
Place of birth missing (living people)
World Wrestling Championships medalists
Universiade medalists in wrestling
Universiade bronze medalists for Azerbaijan
Azerbaijani male sport wrestlers
European Wrestling Champions
Medalists at the 2013 Summer Universiade
Islamic Solidarity Games medalists in wrestling
Islamic Solidarity Games competitors for Azerbaijan
World Wrestling Champions